Aaberg or Åberg is a surname of Swedish origin. People with this surname include:

 Arvid Åberg (1885–1950), Swedish athlete
 Georg Åberg (1893–1946), Swedish athlete
 Gurli Åberg (1843–1922), Swedish actress
 Jan Håkan Åberg (1916–2012), Swedish composer
 Inga Åberg (1773–1837), Swedish actress and singer
 Lars Wilhelm Åberg (1879–1942), Finnish engineer and businessman
 Lasse Åberg (born 1940), Swedish film director
 Majken Åberg (1918–1999), Swedish discus thrower
 Philip Aaberg (born 1949), US jazz pianist
 Sandro Key-Åberg (1922–1991), Swedish poet and novelist
 Sean Aaberg (born 1976), US artist
 Ulrika Åberg (1771–1852), Swedish dancer
 Victoria Åberg (1824-1892), Finnish artist
 Wendla Åberg (1791–1864), Swedish dancer
 Pontus Åberg (born 1993), Swedish ice hockey player

See also 
 Aberg

References 

Swedish-language surnames
Toponymic surnames
Surnames from ornamental names